

National team

Futsal European Clubs Championship

USSR Championship

Preliminary round

Group 1-A

Group 1-B

Group 1-Final

Group 2-A

Group 2-B

Group 2-Final

Group 3-Final
 Edelveis Rostov-on-Don
 Metallurg Aldan

Group 4-Final
 Signal Obninsk
 Mayak Tallinn

Championship round

Group A

Group B

Final

CIS Championship

Final standing

USSR Cup

Final four

References

Russia
Seasons in Russian futsal
futsal
futsal